Cunomyia is a genus of flies in the family Empididae.

Species
C. unica Bickel, 1998

References

Empidoidea genera
Empididae